Pedetinus is a genus of weevils belonging to the family Curculionidae.

The species of this genus are found in Central America.

Species:
 Pedetinus cinnamomeus Rheinheimer, 2018 
 Pedetinus guyanensis Rheinheimer, 2018

References

Curculionidae
Curculionidae genera